Jacob Thompson Baker (April 13, 1847 – December 7, 1919) was an American Democratic Party politician from New Jersey who represented New Jersey's 2nd congressional district for one term from 1913 to 1915.

Early life and education
Baker was born near Cowan, Pennsylvania on April 13, 1847. He attended the public schools and Bucknell University. He studied law, was admitted to the bar in 1870 and commenced practice in Lewisburg, Pennsylvania.

Political career
He was chairman of the Democratic State convention in 1905. Baker moved to New Jersey and was one of the founders of Wildwood and the borough of Wildwood Crest. He was the first Mayor of Wildwood, New Jersey in 1911 and 1912, and was a delegate to the 1912 Democratic National Convention.

Congress
Baker was elected as a Democrat to the Sixty-third Congress, serving in office from March 4, 1913 to March 3, 1915, but was an unsuccessful candidate for reelection in 1914 to the Sixty-fourth Congress.

After leaving Congress, he resumed real estate activities in Wildwood.

Death and legacy
Baker died in Philadelphia on December 7, 1919, and was interred in Cold Spring Presbyterian Cemetery  in Cold Spring, New Jersey.

Baker's home, the J. Thompson Baker House was added to the National Register of Historic Places in 1966.

External links

Jacob Thompson Baker at The Political Graveyard

1847 births
1919 deaths
People from Union County, Pennsylvania
Bucknell University alumni
Democratic Party members of the United States House of Representatives from New Jersey
People from Wildwood, New Jersey
People from Wildwood Crest, New Jersey
The Wildwoods, New Jersey
Mayors of places in New Jersey
19th-century American politicians
Burials at Cold Spring Presbyterian Church